Bandy World Cup Women is an annual bandy competition for the best women's club teams from around the world hosted in Sweden. It was named to correspond to the Bandy World Cup for men's club teams.

Participation 

In 2015, Canada sent a Winnipeg-based  girls high school ice hockey team which had learned to play bandy to the tournament.

Winners

References

External links
Info

 
World Cup
Bandy
Sports club competitions
2003 establishments in Sweden
October sporting events
Recurring sporting events established in 2003
International bandy competitions hosted by Sweden
Multi-national professional sports leagues